Mohammad Hasnain (born 5 April 2000) is a Pakistani cricketer who has played for the Pakistan cricket team since 2019. He is one of the fastest bowlers currently, timed at over 150kmh.

Early life
Hasnain was born in a family of six tracing its roots back to the city of Alwar in the Indian state of Rajasthan, and his father, Mohammad Hussain, who owns a cattle feed shop in Hirabad, Hyderabad, was himself a cricketer (a wicket keeper and then fast bowler) who had to abandon the sport to support his large family.

Domestic career
He made his first-class debut for Pakistan Television in the 2018–19 Quaid-e-Azam Trophy on 1 September 2018. He made his Twenty20 debut for the Quetta Gladiators in the 2019 Pakistan Super League (PSL) on 27 February 2019. He was eventually noted for his pace and accuracy, also bowling the fastest delivery of the tournament, at 151 km/h. He is the first quick bowler to come from Hyderabad in Pakistan. For his bowling figures of 3/30 off 4 overs, he was declared man-of-the match during the PSL final against Peshawar Zalmi, also the first local to get that award in a PSL final.

In March 2019, he was named in Sindh's squad for the 2019 Pakistan Cup.  In September 2019, he was named in Sindh's squad for the 2019–20 Quaid-e-Azam Trophy tournament.

In September 2019, while playing for the Trinbago Knight Riders in the Caribbean Premier League (CPL) he was clocked in at 155.1 km/h, making it the fastest ball ever bowled in the CPL.

In January 2022, he made his debut for the Sydney Thunder in Australia's Big Bash League (BBL), taking 3 wickets for 0 runs in his first over. On 15 January 2022, his bowling action was reported in the match against Sydney Sixers. In June 2022, he was signed by Worcestershire to play in the County Championship in England.

International career
In March 2019, he was named in Pakistan's One Day International (ODI) squad for their series against Australia. He made his ODI debut for Pakistan against Australia on 24 March 2019.

In April 2019, he was named in Pakistan's squad for the 2019 Cricket World Cup. He made his Twenty20 International (T20I) debut for Pakistan against England on 5 May 2019. On 5 October 2019, in the series against Sri Lanka, at the age of 19 years and 183 days, Hasnain became the youngest bowler, the second for Pakistan, and ninth overall, to take a hat-trick in a T20I match.

In November 2019, he was named in Pakistan's squad for the 2019 ACC Emerging Teams Asia Cup in Bangladesh. In May 2020, the Pakistan Cricket Board (PCB) awarded him with a central contract, in a newly created Emerging Players' category, ahead of the 2020–21 season.

In June 2020, he was named in a 29-man squad for Pakistan's tour to England during the COVID-19 pandemic. However, on 23 June 2020, Hasnain was one of seven players from Pakistan's squad to test positive for COVID-19. On 3 November 2020, in the third match against Zimbabwe, he took his first five-wicket haul in ODI cricket, returning figures of 5/26 in 10 overs. In November 2020, he was named in Pakistan's 35-man squad for their tour to New Zealand.

In September 2021, he was named in Pakistan's squad for the 2021 ICC Men's T20 World Cup.

In February 2022, Hasnain was suspended from bowling in international cricket by the International Cricket Council (ICC) due to an illegal bowling action. In June 2022, he was cleared to bowl following assements on his action.

On 22 August 2022 Hasnain was picked as a replacement for the injured Shaheen Afridi for Asia Cup.

References

External links
 

2000 births
Living people
Muhajir people
Pakistani people of Rajasthani descent
Pakistani cricketers
Pakistan One Day International cricketers
Pakistan Twenty20 International cricketers
Pakistan Television cricketers
Hyderabad cricketers
Islamabad United cricketers
Quetta Gladiators cricketers
Trinbago Knight Riders cricketers
Cricketers at the 2019 Cricket World Cup
Twenty20 International hat-trick takers
Sydney Thunder cricketers
Oval Invincibles cricketers